Léa Ferney (born 21 June 2004) is a French para table tennis player. She won the silver medal in the women's C11 event at the 2020 Summer Paralympics held in Tokyo, Japan.

References

External links
 

Living people
2004 births
Sportspeople from Dijon
French female table tennis players
Paralympic table tennis players of France
Paralympic silver medalists for France
Paralympic medalists in table tennis
Table tennis players at the 2020 Summer Paralympics
Medalists at the 2020 Summer Paralympics
21st-century French women